Bridgewater is a census-designated place (CDP) comprising the populated center of the town of Bridgewater, Litchfield County, Connecticut, United States. It is in the north-central part of the town, around the intersection of Connecticut Routes 133 (Main Street) and 867 (Clapboard Road). It includes the Bridgewater Center Historic District.

Bridgewater was first listed as a CDP prior to the 2020 census.

References 

Census-designated places in Litchfield County, Connecticut
Census-designated places in Connecticut